Paul Courto is a retired Australian rules footballer who played for Hobart in the Tasmanian Australian National Football League. Courto played at full forward and was the league's leading goalkicker for the 1980 season. He was also the leading goalkicker in the Winfield Statewide Cup.

Courto was named at full forward in Hobart's "Official Best Team 1947 to 2002".

References

Living people
Australian rules footballers from Tasmania
Hobart Football Club players
Year of birth missing (living people)